Matthew Rose may refer to:

 Matthew Rose (footballer) (born 1975), retired football (soccer) player
 Matthew Rose (journalist) (born 1972), British-born reporter for the Wall Street Journal
 Matthew K. Rose (born 1960), CEO of the Burlington Northern Santa Fe Corporation
 Matthew Rose (bass) (born 1978), English bass singer
 Matthew Rose (swimmer) (born 1981), Canadian swimmer
 Matthew Rose (EastEnders), a character on the BBC television program EastEnders
 Matt Rose (American soccer) (born 1991), American professional soccer player
 Matt Kuwata (born 1994), Japanese model and media personality releasing music under the pseudonym Matt Rose